The 1968–69 Segunda División de Baloncesto was the ninth edition of the Spanish basketball second division.

Regular season

Group 1

Group 2

Group 3

Group 4

Group 5

Group 6

Second round

Group A

Group B

Final round

Repechage round

Group A

References
1968–69 FEB Book of activities

External links
Spanish Basketball Federation

2
Second level Spanish basketball league seasons